USV may refer to:

Businesses and organizations
 Union Square Ventures, an American venture capital company
 University of Silicon Valley
 USV Private Limited, an Indian pharmaceutical company

Government and military
 United States of Venezuela
 United States Volunteers, non-regular US Army troops
 76 mm divisional gun M1939 (USV), a WWII Soviet field gun

Other uses
 Ultrasonic vocalization by animals such as bats and rodents
 Unmanned surface vehicle, an unmanned vessel/boat, a nautical drone

See also